The Have a Nice Day Tour was a worldwide concert tour by American rock band Bon Jovi.  It took place between November 2005 and July 2006. The tour supported their ninth studio album Have a Nice Day.

The tour was a significant commercial successthe group played to about 2 million fans and the tour grossed a total of $132 million. It was the third-highest-grossing tour of 2006, just behind the Rolling Stones' A Bigger Bang World Tour and Madonna's Confessions Tour.

The show
The set lists greatly varied between concerts, so after each show its set list was posted on the official website. Most concerts began with the song "Last Man Standing" from the Have a Nice Day record, with the show beginning as Jon Bon Jovi suddenly appeared on a small platform in the middle of the audience at the far end from the stage, followed by "You Give Love a Bad Name". "Livin' on a Prayer" was almost always played as the finalé before any encores.

For the early North American and United Kingdom dates, each city had a local band open for Bon Jovi; the band had decided this for a chance to promote local talent. Canadian band Nickelback, who had great success with their latest release (All The Right Reasons) supported Bon Jovi on the European dates of the tour, as well as on the band's summer stadium tour in North America.

Set list
Typical set-list:
 "Last Man Standing"
 "You Give Love a Bad Name"
 "Complicated"
 "Born to Be My Baby"
 "Story of My Life"
 "I'll Sleep When I'm Dead"
 "Runaway"
 "The Radio Saved My Life Tonight"
 "Novocaine"
 "I Won't Back Down" (Tom Petty cover)
 "Have a Nice Day"
 "Who Says You Can't Go Home?"
 "It's My Life"
 "I'll Be There for You"
 "Blaze of Glory" (cover)
 "Bed of Roses"
 "Bad Medicine"
 "Raise Your Hands"
 "Livin' on a Prayer"
Encore:

 "Welcome to Wherever You Are"
  "In These Arms"
 "Everyday"
 "Wanted Dead or Alive"
 "Someday I'll Be Saturday Night"

Tour dates

: These performances were originally scheduled at the new Wembley Stadium in London (the band were due to be the first band to play at the new stadium, having closed the old stadium with their Crush Tour in August 2000), however they were moved when the completion of the stadium was delayed until 2007.

Personnel

Bon Jovi
Jon Bon Jovi – lead vocals, guitar, maracas for Keep the Faith
Richie Sambora – lead guitar, slide guitar, lead vocals for I'll Be There For You, backing vocals, talk box
Hugh McDonald – bass, backing vocals
David Bryan – keyboards, backing vocals
Tico Torres – drums, percussion

Additional musicians
Bobby Bandiera – rhythm guitar, backing vocals
Jeff Kazee – keyboards, Hammond organ, backing vocals

See also
 List of highest grossing concert tours

Notes

References

External links
 Official tour website

Bon Jovi concert tours
2005 concert tours
2006 concert tours